Phillip Scott is an American politician. A Republican, he is a member of the Virginia House of Delegates, representing the 88th district. Scott was first elected in 2021, succeeding retiring delegate Mark Cole.

Personal life and career
Scott was born in Voorhees, New Jersey, and raised in New Jersey and Maine. Scott moved to Virginia in high school. After working in fast food and construction, Scott began working for a federal contractor as a background investigator. Scott is a resident of Spotsylvania County, Virginia, where he lives with his wife and five daughters.

Political career

Scott was nominated as the Republican candidate for the 88th district on April 24, 2021, defeating two other candidates in a closed party canvass. The district was described by Virginia Public Access Project as "strong Republican." In the November 2021 general election, Scott defeated Democrat Kecia Evans by a 57 to 41 percent margin.

In the 2022 legislative session, Scott sponsored a bill to allow localities to lower vehicle tax rates, in response to rising prices for used cars. This bill was signed into law by Governor Glenn Youngkin. The second dealt with licensing requirements for licensed professional counselors. In the 2023 Assembly session, Scott introduced a bill that would reduce Virginia's early voting period from 45 days to 14 days.

In the 2023 House of Delegates elections, Scott is running in the new 63rd district. Virginia's legislative maps were redrawn in the decennial redistricting.

References 

Living people
21st-century American politicians
Republican Party members of the Virginia House of Delegates
1982 births
People from Spotsylvania County, Virginia
People from Voorhees Township, New Jersey